Joseph A. Boncore is an American lawyer from Winthrop, Massachusetts, who was elected to the Massachusetts Senate in 2016 from the First Suffolk and Middlesex District. He resigned in September 2021 to become CEO of the Massachusetts Biotechnology Council. He is a member of the Democratic Party.

Education 
Boncore attended high school at St. John's Preparatory School in Danvers, Massachusetts. He graduated from Providence College and from the Massachusetts School of Law.

Early career

Law career 
Since being admitted to the bar Boncore has worked in his family's legal firm, Boncore Law Practice, and for three years as a public defender with Suffolk Lawyers for Justice, serving indigent criminal defendants.

Winthrop Housing Authority 
Boncore joined the Winthrop Housing Authority Board of Commissioners in 2009 and later became chairman of the board.

Political career 
Following the resignation of Senator Anthony Petruccelli in 2016, Boncore declared his candidacy for the now open First Suffolk and Middlesex state Senate seat. He secured the Democratic nomination after beating seven other candidates and was unopposed in both the May 10th special election and the November 8th general election.

See also
 2019–2020 Massachusetts legislature
 2021–2022 Massachusetts legislature

References

External links
 Legislative website
 Campaign website

1983 births
Living people
Democratic Party Massachusetts state senators
People from Winthrop, Massachusetts
Providence College alumni
21st-century American politicians